Fermín Francisco de Carvajal-Vargas y Alarcón, 1st Duke of San Carlos and Grandee of Spain (Chile, 1722 - Madrid, 1799) was a Spanish-Peruvian noble. He was the last Correo Mayor de Indias.

He was married at Cathedral of Lima on 11 June 1741 to his cousin Joaquina María Magdalena Brun y Carvajal. The couple had 4 children: Magdalena de Carvajal, later Marquise of Lara; Mariano Joaquín de Carvajal-Vargas, later 5th Count of Puerto; Diego Melchor de Carvajal-Vargas; and Luis Fermín de Carvajal, later 1st Count of La Unón.

Dukes of Spain
1722 births
1799 deaths